Chadar Badar, also known as Santhal Puppetry, is a tribal performing art of the Santhal people, mainly found in the Indian states of Jharkhand, West Bengal, Odisha, Bihar and Assam. Once a dying art form, it was revived by the efforts of social activists such as Ravi Dwivedi and exponents like Sukan Mardi and Daman Murmu. The Government of west Bengal has set up a National Puppet Museum at Kankurgachi to preserve the art forms of puppetry including Chadar Badar.

Chadar Badar is performed with the assistance of wooden puppets hung inside a wooden box, open on three or four sides with curtains. The performer narrates stories by words and verse from ancient Santhal culture using the puppets, accompanied by tribal musical instruments. The painted puppets are 5 to 9 inches tall and has movable limbs, manipulated by the performer, using strings attached to them.

See also

 Santhal people

References

Further reading
 

Tribal art
Performing arts in India
Puppetry in India